The 57th Annual TV Week Logie Awards was held on Sunday 3 May 2015 at the Crown Palladium in Melbourne, and broadcast live on the Nine Network. The red carpet arrivals coverage was hosted by Shelley Craft and Jules Lund.

Public voting for the Most Popular categories began on 12 January 2015 and ended on 22 February 2015. Nominations were announced on 22 March 2015. Television presenter Carrie Bickmore won the Gold Logie Award for Most Popular Personality on Australian Television. Love Child received the most nominations with seven, followed by INXS: Never Tear Us Apart with six. Hamish & Andy's Gap Year South America and Home and Away both received four nominations. Home and Away was inducted into the Logies Hall of Fame.

Changes
On 24 October 2014, TV Week announced that it would be restoring the Most Outstanding Comedy Program category to the 2015 Logie Awards. The industry-voted category had been absent from Logie ceremonies since 2009 and TV Week said the decision to bring it back came after consulting with the industry, as well as listening to feedback from readers, viewers and voters. TV Week editor Emma Nolan stated, "The standard of Australian comedies has been outstanding in 2014 – and we felt that shows in that genre deserved to be judged up against each other in their own category. In recent years, comedy nominees had competed with other genre shows in the Most Outstanding Light Entertainment Program category.

Winners and nominees
In the tables below, winners are listed first and highlighted in bold.

Gold Logie

Acting/Presenting

Most Popular Programs

Most Outstanding Programs

Performers
Ricky Martin – "Mr. Put It Down"
Meghan Trainor – "All About That Bass" / "Lips Are Movin" and "Dear Future Husband"
The Script

Presenters
Dave Hughes
Amanda Keller and Eddie Perfect
Delta Goodrem
Peter Helliar and Denise Scott
Melanie Vallejo and Daniel Wyllie
Shane Jacobson
Chris Brown and Jennifer Hawkins
Julia Morris
Justine Clarke and Gary Sweet
Hamish Blake and Andy Lee
Gracie Gilbert and Jonathan LaPaglia
Mick Molloy
Waleed Aly and Sylvia Jeffreys
Richard Roxburgh
Dannii Minogue
Sonia Kruger and Danny O'Donoghue
Lachy Hulme
Kerri-Anne Kennerley, Delta Goodrem and Kate Ritchie

Most nominations
By network
ABC – 32
Nine Network – 25
Seven Network – 20
Network Ten – 19
Foxtel – 9
SBS – 8
Source:

 By program
 Love Child (Nine Network) – 7
 INXS: Never Tear Us Apart (Seven Network) – 6
 Hamish & Andy's Gap Year South America (Nine Network) / Home and Away (Seven Network) – 4
 ANZAC Girls (ABC) / Carlotta (ABC) / Offspring (Network Ten) / The Project (Network Ten) / Wentworth (SoHo) – 3
Source:

In Memoriam
The In Memoriam segment was introduced by Michael Slater who spoke of the passing of Richie Benaud. Harpist Alana Conway performed a cover version of Eva Cassidy's "Songbird". The following deceased were honoured:

 Terry Gill, actor
 Norman Yemm, actor
 Elaine Lee, actress
 Jeff Truman, screenwriter, actor
 Michael Shephard, publicist
 |Mark Byrne, agent
 Thea Cavan, TCN receptionist
 Leigh Spence, director
 Mike Dorsey, actor
 Coralie Condon OAM, entertainer
 Michael McCarthy, host
 Barry Donnelly, actor
 Caterina De Nave, commissioning editor
 Allison Rowe, founding director, Screenrights
 Garry Jones, executive
 Geoff Stone, host
 Ian Ross, news presenter
 Harry Potter, journalist
 Brian Cahill, news presenter
 Tony Dickinson, news presenter
 Ian Cook, news director
 Robert Clark, Head of Children's News
 Murray Travis, journalist
 Barry McQueen, newsreader
 Stella Young, writer, activist
 James Walker, screenwriter
 Ted Roberts, screenwriter, producer
 Jan Gash, make up artist
 Paul Ramsay, founder and chair, Prime Media
 Jerome Ehlers, actor
 Sarah Kemp, actress
 John Walton, actor
 Bill Kerr, actor
 Peter Curtin, actor
 Stephanie Quinlan, presenter
 Gavin Jones, executive producer
 Les Wasley BEM, camera operator
 Max Cleary, camera operator
 Joe Murray, director, producer
 Niki Wilton, floor manager
 Betty Lucas, actress
 Max Morrison, staging manager
 Pete Michell, presenter
 Stephen Phillips, journalist
 Stuart Wagstaff, entertainer

References

External links

2015
2015 television awards
2015 in Australian television
2010s in Melbourne
2015 awards in Australia